Amt Ortrand is an Amt ("collective municipality") in the district of Oberspreewald-Lausitz, in Brandenburg, Germany. Its seat is in Ortrand.

The Amt Ortrand consists of the following municipalities:
Frauendorf
Großkmehlen
Kroppen
Lindenau
Ortrand
Tettau

Demography

References 

ortrand
Oberspreewald-Lausitz